Yawson is an English surname. Notable people with the surname include:

 Helen Yawson (born 1967)
 Janet Yawson, Ghanaian long jumper
 Steven Yawson, English footballer
 Prince Yawson, Ghanaian actor and comedian
 John Nketia Yawson

English-language surnames